Dhruba Narayan Ghosh was an Indian career bureaucrat and civil servant who served as the twelfth Chairman of State Bank of India. He was also the founder and very first chairman of the ICRA Limited.

Life 

Most of the details about his early life are known from his autobiography No Regrets published by Rupa Publications on 1 August 2015. The book was released by Arundhati Bhattacharya, the then Chairman of State Bank of India and Deepak Parekh, chairman of the Housing Development Finance Corporation on 27 August 2015.

Education 

He holds a Master's degree in Economics from the University of Calcutta.

Career

Early career 

He joined the Indian Audit and Accounts Service and worked in a number of roles. He played a key role in the nationalization of Indian banks.

Banking career 

He served as the twelfth Chairman of State Bank of India from 13 May 1985 until 12 May 1989.

After his retirement from the State Bank of India in 1989, he was succeeded by Atal V. as the Chairman of State Bank of India.

It was during his time at the State Bank of India, that the drive towards computerization of branches was begun. The State Bank of India was also rated by the international rating agency the S&P Global Ratings for the first time during his tenure.

Later career 

After having retired from the State Bank of India in 1989, he held a number of executive posts in the private sector which included:

 Member of Board of Directors of Philips company
 Member of Board of Directors of Larsen & Toubro company
 Chairman of the Board of Governors of the Indian Institute of Management Lucknow
 Chairman of the board of Sundaram BNP Paribas Asset Management Company Limited
 Chairman of the board of Gerdau Steel India Limited
 Chairman of the Management Development Institute, Gurgaon
 Chairman and Director of The Peerless General Finance and Investment Company Limited
 Managing Director of Damodar Cement and Slag Limited
 Independent Non-Executive Director of Birla Corporation Limited
 Independent Director of Housing Development Finance Corporation.
 Director of Tata Global Beverages Limited.

He has also served as the president of the Society for the Preservation of Satyajit Ray Archives.

In 1991, he became the Managing Trustee of the Sameeksha Trust, which is the publisher of Economic and Political Weekly.

References

External links 

 Official Website
 SBI chairmen
 SBI history

Indian bankers
State Bank of India
Chairmen of the State Bank of India
Indian corporate directors
Indian civil servants
Indian government officials